Stephanoaetus is a genus of very large birds of prey from Sub-Saharan Africa and Madagascar. Only one of the two known species is extant.

Species
 Crowned eagle or crowned hawk-eagle (Stephanoaetus coronatus).
 † Malagasy crowned eagle or Madagascar crowned hawk-eagle (Stephanoaetus mahery).

References

 
Bird genera
Bird genera with one living species
 
Taxa named by William Lutley Sclater